Suta minimus, also known as Rosen's snake, is a species of venomous snake that is endemic to Australia. The specific epithet fasciata (“banded”) refers to the body markings.

Description
The species grows to an average of about 40 cm in length.

Behaviour
The snake is viviparous, with a litter size of four.

Distribution and habitat
The species occurs in much of arid inland Western Australia.

References

 
fasciata
Snakes of Australia
Endemic fauna of Australia
Reptiles of Western Australia
Reptiles described in 1905